On October 12, 2015, two Palestinian boys, 15-year-old Hassan Khalid Manasra and his cousin 13-year-old Ahmad Manasra, both from Beit Hanina stabbed two Israelis in the Israeli settlement of Pisgat Ze'ev in Jerusalem in the Israeli-occupied West Bank. Hassan was shot dead by a police officer while Ahmad was struck by a car. The attack attracted significant attention among both Israelis and Palestinians, because of the young age of the attackers. A clip from the aftermath of the attack showed Ahmad laying in a pool of blood while settlers shouted at him; the video spread on social media. Palestinian President Mahmoud Abbas erroneously claimed in a televised speech that Ahmad had been executed.

Attack 
According to security camera footage of the attack, it went as follows:

Hassan and Ahmed equipped themselves with knives. In Pisgat Ze'ev, they found a 20-year-old male security guard who they chased after with their knives drawn, and stabbed. The guard fled, and they instead turned their attention to some nearby shops. Outside of a candy shop, they found a 13-year-old boy on a bicycle, who they stabbed. The boy sustained critical injuries. Another angle from the security camera footage shows Hassan running across a street. 

Hassan was subsequently shot and killed, reportedly while advancing towards police with a knife in his hand.

Ahmad tried to escape the area, but was struck by a pursuing car and suffered serious head injuries.

Viral video 
A viral video of the attack spread on social media. The two minute-long clip showed Ahmad laying on the street of Pisgat Ze'ev after being struck by a car. His legs were twisted behind him, and blood was coming out of his head as bystanders filmed using cell phones. A crowd surrounds him and shouts, "Die, son of a bitch" along other profanities in Hebrew. After about a minute, an ambulance arrives.

Responses 
Abbas reacted strongly to the attack. On October 15, he gave a televised speech translated to English by The Jerusalem Post in which he lambasted the "Israeli aggression" and called for the "immediate positive interference by the international community before it is too late." He reiterated that the Palestinian side would not accept any changes to the "status quo" for the Temple Mount. He also mentioned "the execution of our children in cold blood as they did with the child Ahmed Manasra and other children from Jerusalem." In an English translation of Abbas' speech released by the PLO Abbas was quoted as saying Israel "shoots" Palestinian children "as they did with the child Ahmed Manasra," replacing the word "executions" with more moderate language.

The speech was heavily criticized by the Israeli side for its inflammatory language and because Ahmed was still alive.

Dr. Asher Salmon, the deputy director of the Hadassah Medical Center in Jerusalem were Ahmed was treated, said that the boy was still alive and was in light-to-moderate condition. Photos of Manasra from the hospital were released to support his statements.

Trial of Ahmad 

On November 8, 2015 a ten-minute long video was leaked to Palestinian media showing Israeli interrogators verbally abusing and shouting curses at the visibly distressed Ahmad. The video shows him confessing to the crime which he later would recant. According to Brad Parker of the Defence for Children International - Palestine the video provided evidence of a violation of international juvenile standards found in the UN Convention on the Rights of the Child. He further claimed that the situation in the video might have amounted to torture.

Prosecutor Yuval Kedar said that it was irrelevant that Ahmad was a minor and that he should be prosecuted "to the fullest extent of the law."

In December 2015, Tareq Barghout, an Arab Israeli lawyer on Manasra's defense team, was arrested on suspicion of praising attackers and encouraging further attacks on Facebook. The court released Barghout and noted that the material was poorly translated from Arabic to Hebrew and that he had freedom of expression.

In May 2016, Ahmad was convicted on two counts of attempted murder, though no blood was found on the knife found in his possession, and he was sentenced to 12 years in prison. His legal counsel, the Israeli attorney Lea Tsemel, called the conviction "surprising, unbalanced and problematic." She argued that it was Hassan that carried out the stabbings and that neither boy intended to kill anyone, that they "just wanted to scare Jews so they’d stop killing Palestinians."

In August 2017, the Israeli Supreme Court reduced his sentence to 9 and a half years in prison. The court upheld the compensation Ahmed should pay to the two victims; NIS 100,000 to the 13-year-old boy and NIS 80,000 to the 20-year-old security guard.

The "Youth bill" 

In response to Hassan and Ahmad Manasra's attack and similar attacks carried out by Palestinian children against Israelis during the 2015–2016 wave of violence in the Israeli-Palestinian conflict, the Israeli parliament, the Knesset, in August 2016 passed the "Youth bill." The bill allowed Israeli authorities to imprison children from the age of twelve if convicted of "terrorism." Knesset member Anat Berko who introduced the bill said "A society is allowed to protect itself. To those who are murdered with a knife in the heart it does not matter if the child is 12 or 15." Israeli human rights group B'Tselem condemned the bill.

See also 
 List of violent incidents in the Israeli–Palestinian conflict, 2015#October
 2015–2016 wave of violence in Israeli-Palestinian conflict

References

External links 
 Don't believe Abbas' lies, see it for yourself, Israeli Ministry of Foreign Affairs
 13 year old Ahmed Mansra is Alive, Oct 15, 2015, Israeli Government Press Office
 Ahmad Manasra ... Israeli brutality exposed, Oct 13, 2015, Ministry Of Information Palestine
 جلسة تحقيق مع الطفل الجريح مناصرة , Nov 9, 2015, Ma'an News Agency
 Inside an incident that’s triggering anger from Palestinians and Israelis, Oct 26, 2015, PBS NewsHour.

2015 in Jerusalem
Attacks in Asia in 2015
Deaths by firearm in the West Bank
Israeli–Palestinian conflict in Jerusalem
People killed by Israeli security forces
September 2015 events in Asia
Stabbing attacks in 2015
2015 crimes in Asia
Stabbing attacks in Asia
East Jerusalem